The Epistula ad Carpianum ("Letter to Carpian") or Letter of Eusebius is the title traditionally given to a letter from Eusebius of Caesarea to a Christian named Carpianus. In this letter, Eusebius explains his ingenious system of gospel harmony, the Eusebian Canons (tables) that divide the four canonical gospels, and describes their purpose, ten in number.

Eusebius explains that Ammonius the Alexandrian had made a system in which he placed sections of the gospels of Mark, Luke and John next to their parallel sections in Matthew. As this disrupted the normal text order of the gospels of Mark, Luke and John, Eusebius used a system in which he placed the references to the parallel texts in ten tables or 'canons'. By using these tables, the parallel texts could easily be looked up, but it also remained possible to read a gospel in its normal order. (The number of sections was: Matthew 355, Mark 236, Luke 342, John 232 – together 1165 sections). The number of each "Ammonian section" is written in the margin of a manuscript, and underneath these numbers, another number was written in coloured ink. The coloured numbers referred to one of the ten Eusebian canons, in which the reference numbers were to be found of the parallel sections in the other gospels.

Text 

The text of this epistle in Koine Greek is:

English translation:

The copy of this letter appears with the canon tables on the opening folios of many Greek Gospel manuscripts (e.g. 021, 65, 108, 109, 112, 113, 114, 117, etc.). The epistle is also given in modern editions of Greek New Testament.

References

External links 
 Epistula ad Carpianum ad canones evangeliorum praemissa (original text in Koine Greek)
  Eusebius of Caesarea, Letter to Carpianus on the gospel canons

4th-century Christian texts
Canonical Gospels
Greek New Testament manuscripts
Works by Eusebius of Caesarea